The 2022–23 Irani Cup, also known as Mastercard Irani Trophy due to sponsorship reasons, was the 59th edition of the Irani Cup, a first-class cricket competition in India. It was played as a one-off match between Madhya Pradesh, the winners of the 2021–22 Ranji Trophy, and a Rest of India cricket team, from 1 to 5 March 2023.

In March 2020, the Board of Control for Cricket in India (BCCI) confirmed that all domestic cricket in India was suspended due to coronavirus, including the 2019–20 Irani Cup. However, the cancelled match was played as an opening match of this season from 1 to 5 October, with the 2019–20 Ranji Trophy winners Saurashtra playing against a Rest of India team.

Squads

On 28 February 2023, Mayank Markande was ruled out of Rest of India's squad due to a right index finger injury. Shams Mulani was named as his replacement.

Match

References

External links
 Series home at ESPN Cricinfo

First-class cricket matches
2022 in Indian cricket
2023 in Indian cricket
Irani Cup
Irani Cup
Irani Cup
Irani Cup